Makhete Diop (born 8 July 1987) is a Senegalese footballer who plays as a striker for Emirati club Al-Sharjah.

Club career
Diop previously played for Al Watani in the Saudi League. He was the leading goalscorer in the 2009–10 Lebanese league. In August 2010, Diop signed for Syrian League club Al-Karamah on a three-year deal.

On 1 February 2021, Diop returned to UAE Pro League side Al-Dhafra.

Career statistics

Honours 
Individual
 Lebanese Premier League Team of the Season: 2009–10
 Lebanese Premier League top scorer: 2009–10

References

External links
 

1988 births
Living people
Senegalese footballers
Association football forwards
Port Autonome players
Al-Watani Club players
ASC Yakaar players
Nejmeh SC players
Al-Karamah players
Al Dhafra FC players
Al Ahli Club (Dubai) players
Shabab Al-Ahli Club players
Beijing Renhe F.C. players
Al-Shabab FC (Riyadh) players
Sharjah FC players
Senegalese expatriate footballers
Expatriate footballers in Saudi Arabia
Expatriate footballers in Lebanon
Expatriate footballers in Syria
Expatriate footballers in the United Arab Emirates
Expatriate footballers in China
Saudi Professional League players
UAE Pro League players
Lebanese Premier League players
Chinese Super League players
Senegalese expatriate sportspeople in Saudi Arabia
Senegalese expatriate sportspeople in Lebanon
Senegalese expatriate sportspeople in Syria
Senegalese expatriate sportspeople in the United Arab Emirates
Syrian Premier League players
Lebanese Premier League top scorers